Scrobipalpuloides chiquitelloides is a moth in the family Gelechiidae. It was described by Powell and Povolný in 2001. It is found in North America, where it has been recorded from California.

The length of the forewings is 3.9-4.8 mm for males and 4.3-4.5 mm for females. The forewings are covered by whitish scales, many of which have grey or dark grey tips, concentrated in apical area indicating the marginal and submarginal spotting. There is a triad of small black stigmata in the cell and indications of additional stigmata on the costa near the base and near the base. The hindwings are cinereous. Adults have been recorded on wing in April and from November to December in one generation per year.

References

Scrobipalpuloides
Moths described in 2001